Utz may refer to:

Art and entertainment 
Utz (film), a 1992 film based on Bruce Chatwin's novel
Utz (novel), Bruce Chatwin's 1988 novel, his last
Utz, a song by Enon from their 2003 album Hocus Pocus

Other uses 
Utz (name), a list of people with the name
UTZ Certified, a worldwide certification program for responsible coffee and other products
Utz Quality Foods, an American manufacturer of snack foods
Utz Site, a Native American archeological site
Utz Spur, a ridge in Antarctica

See also
Uz (disambiguation), the name of several biblical personages